Miloslava Svobodová (born 7 February 1984) is a Czech basketball player who competed in the 2008 Summer Olympics.

References

1984 births
Living people
Czech women's basketball players
Olympic basketball players of the Czech Republic
Basketball players at the 2008 Summer Olympics